LPB may stand for:

Companies
 Latino Public Broadcasting, a non-profit organization that is funded by the Corporation for Public Broadcasting in the United States
 Lesotho PostBank, a bank in Lesotho
 Louisiana Public Broadcasting, a state-run, viewer-supported network of PBS member stations serving the U.S. state of Louisiana
 LPB (bank), a Lithuanian bank, previously known as "Latvijas Pasta Banka"

Places
 El Alto International Airport in La Paz, Bolivia, which is assigned IATA airport code LPB
 Logistics Park Bozhurishte, a logistics and industrial park located near Sofia, the capital of Bulgaria
Luang Prabang, a city in Laos

Sports
 Colombian Professional Baseball League, known in Spanish as Liga Profesional de Béisbol Colombiano (LPB)
 Liga Portuguesa de Basquetebol, the Portuguese national basketball league
 Liga Profesional de Baloncesto, former name of the Venezuelan national basketball league (1993–2019)
 Liga Profesional de Baloncesto (Panama), the top professional basketball league in Panama

Science and technology
 Linear Power Booster, signal amplifier by Electro-Harmonix
 Lipopolysaccharide binding protein, protein that binds to Lipopolysaccharide for presentation to receptors
 Liquid packaging board, a multi-ply paperboard
 Loss Prevention Bulletin, published by the UK Institution of Chemical Engineers
 Low plasticity burnishing, a method of surface enhancement/metal improvement

Slang
 Low-Ping Bastard, a term used to refer to players in multiplayer online games with low latency, and thus low lag

See also